A. Karunanidhi ( Tamil : கருணாநிதி) was an Indian actor and comedian who featured mainly in Tamil-language films. He was active in the field from 1948 till 1978. Though he was a comedian, the roles he played in some of the films were so imperative to the story. A case in point is his role in the award-winning film Veerapandiya Kattabomman. He featured as "Sundaralingam", a servant in Kattabomman's court. The role was developed into a spy and he played it brilliantly. In some of the films, he will not talk much, but his body language itself will make the audience laugh, as in Missiamma. He has also appeared in women's attire in some films. The turning and twisting of his body was well appreciated even by women. In Adhey Kangal (1967 film), he did the role of a Malayalee cook and spoke Malayalee Tamil, making the audience laugh to their hilt. Apart from acting, at times he gave ideas for comedy scenes in films.

T. P. Muthulakshmi was his co-star in many films.

While he was acting in films, he ran a non-vegetarian hotel called Maamiya Hotel at Thiyagaraya Nagar in Chennai.

He died in 1981, affected by diabetes.

Partial filmography

References

External links

1923 births
1981 deaths
Male actors from Chennai
Tamil comedians
Male actors in Tamil cinema
Indian male film actors
20th-century Indian male actors
Indian male comedians
20th-century comedians